Robert Ray Whitley (November 22, 1943 – May 5, 2013) was an American beach music composer and singer-songwriter.  He was best known for composing hit songs recorded by The Tams and Guy Darrell, and he also released 14 of his own singles between 1961 and 1970.

Biography

Whitely was born in Columbus, Georgia on November 22, 1943 to Robert S. and Willie Bell Whitley. Whitley was 14 when he formed his first band in his hometown. Producer Felton Jarvis soon discovered him in an Atlanta High School. Jarvis introduced Whitley to Atlanta music producer Bill Lowery, who saw Whitley's potential and signed him to a contract.

Whitley's songwriting credits include "What Kind of Fool (Do You Think I Am)" (which reached #9 on the Billboard charts), "I've Been Hurt", "Hey Girl, Don't Bother Me", "You Lied to Your Daddy", and "Be Young, Be Foolish, Be Happy" (co-written with J.R. Cobb of the Atlanta Rhythm Section) for The Tams. His compositions were also recorded by Billy Joe Royal, Tommy Roe, Guy Darrell, The Swinging Medallions, Bill Deal and the Rhondels, Mylon LeFevre and Sonia Evans.

Whitley toured nationally as a singer and performer, in addition to his work as a songwriter. He was inducted into the Georgia Music Hall of Fame in 1991.

Later in his life, Whitley struggled with alcoholism and homelessness; as of 2011, he was living in a shelter in Gainesville, Georgia. Whitley died on May 5, 2013, after several months of illness.  Ray had one child, Christopher.

Discography as a recording artist
1961 - I Wasn't Sure / There Goes A Teardrop - Vee Jay USA	VJ 414		
1962 - Yessiree-Yessiree / A Love We Can Have And Hold - Vee Jay USA	VJ 433	 
1962 - It Hurts / Deeper In Love - Vee Jay USA	VJ 448	 
1963 - Teenage Crush / Young Heartaches - Vee Jay USA	VJ 521
1964 - Walking Back To You / Weep Little Girl Weep - Vee Jay USA	VJ 591	 
1965 - I've Been Hurt / There Is One Boy - Dunhill USA	D-201 
1965 - Runaway / I'll Tell The Robin - Apt USA	45-25086 
1966 - The End Of My World / Just A Boy In Love - Columbia USA	4-43607	 
1967 - Take Back Your Mind / Here Today, Gone Tomorrow - Columbia USA	4-43980	 
1968 - 1983 / Gotta Go There - TRX USA	45-T-5007  
1969 - Don't Throw Your Love To The Wind / Underdose Of Faith - 123 USA 1707	 
1970 - Hey Girl, Don't Bother Me / Everybody - Attarack USA	ATT 103

Selected songs written by Ray Whitley

References

Further reading

1943 births
2013 deaths
American male singers
People from Georgia (U.S. state)